Dean Stanley Tarbell (October 19, 1913 – May 26, 1999) was an American chemist.

Tarbell was notable for his research of detection methods of chemical warfare agents (including mustard gas) during World War II, his discovery of new types of organic chemicals (including mixed carboxylic-carbonic anhydrides), and his synthesis of anti-malarial drugs.
Tarbell was chairman of the chemistry department at University of Rochester,

Charles Fredrick Houghton professor of Chemistry

a member of the National Academy of Sciences,
a member of the American Academy of Arts and Sciences,
a recipient of Dexter Award of the Division of the History of Chemistry of the American Chemical Society
a recipient of Charles Holmes Herty Medal, the American Chemical Society,
a distinguished professor at Vanderbilt University.
The National Academy of Sciences said that Tarbell "had a distinguished career in research and teaching in organic chemistry".

Life and career 
 1913: born in Hancock, New Hampshire
 1934: graduated from Harvard University
 1937: receiving Ph.D. from Harvard University
 1946-1947 Guggenheim fellowship, Oxford University
 1959: election to the National Academy of Sciences
 1960 Charles Fredrick Houghton professor of Chemistry, University of Rochester
 1964 Chairman of the Department of Chemistry, University of Rochester
 1967 Distinguished Professor, Vanderbilt University
 1973 Charles Holmes Herty Medal, the American Chemical Society
 1989 the American Chemical Society’s Dexter Award

References 

1913 births
1999 deaths
20th-century American chemists
Harvard University alumni
University of Rochester faculty
Vanderbilt University faculty
Members of the United States National Academy of Sciences
People from Hancock, New Hampshire
Historians of science